The Ministry of Science, Technology and Higher Education ( or MCTES) is a Portuguese government ministry.

See also
Fundação para a Ciência e Tecnologia
 Arquivo Histórico Ultramarino
 Ministry of Higher Education, Science and Technology (disambiguation): Some countries had a ministry formerly with both of these names

External links
 

Portugal
Science, Technology and Higher Education